Peggy Sattler (born ) is a politician in Ontario, Canada. She has been a New Democratic Member of Provincial Parliament of the Legislative Assembly of Ontario representing the riding of London West since 2013.

Background
Sattler was born in Dundas, Ontario. She attended McMaster University where she earned a bachelor's degree in political science and a master's degree at Western University in educational policy. Sattler was working on the master’s degree when she went to Ottawa as a staffer for NDP MPs Marion Dewar and Jack Whittaker from 1987-90. There she met her future husband, a fellow staffer named Neil Bradford. She also served on the staff of NDP MPP Marilyn Churley at Queen’s Park from 1990–95, after which she and her husband moved to London in 1995 from Toronto. She was a Thames Valley District School Board trustee for 13 years, including terms as vice-chair from 2004 to 2006 and chair from 2006 to 2008. Sattler was also Western Region vice-president of the Ontario Public School Boards' Association. Professionally, until her election as MPP, Sattler was director of policy studies with the Academica Group, specializing in post-secondary education issues. She lives in London with her husband Neil Bradford and their two children.

Politics
Sattler was elected in a by-election on August 1, 2013. She ran as the New Democratic candidate in the riding of London West. She defeated Progressive Conservative candidate Ali Chahbar by 3,381 votes. She was re-elected in the 2014 provincial election defeating PC candidate Jeff Bennett by 5,951 votes.

She is the party's House Leader, and Critic for Democratic Reform, Employment Standards & Pay Equity.

Electoral record

References

External links

1962 births
Living people
Ontario New Democratic Party MPPs
Ontario school board trustees
Politicians from London, Ontario
University of Western Ontario alumni
Women MPPs in Ontario
21st-century Canadian politicians
21st-century Canadian women politicians